The Days of Anna Madrigal (2014) is the ninth and final book in the Tales of the City series by American novelist Armistead Maupin. The book was adapted by Lin Coghlan and broadcast as a ten-part radio drama on BBC Radio 4 in July 2017.

Plot summary
Anna Madrigal, the 92-year-old former landlady of 28 Barbary Lane, recalls her teen years as Andy Ramsay, the son of a brothel owner in Winnemucca, Nevada. Meanwhile in the present, Anna's longtime friend and former tenant Michael Tolliver finds that his much-younger husband Ben is a constant reminder of his own mortality. Another former tenant, Brian Hawkins, offers to take Anna for a final visit back to Winnemucca, where she claims she has unfinished business, as Brian's adopted daughter Shawna puts the wheels in motion to have a baby. It all converges at Burning Man, an unlikely destination for Anna.

References

External links
The Days of Anna Madrigal at ArmisteadMaupin.com

2014 American novels
2010s LGBT novels
Novels by Armistead Maupin
Tales of the City
Novels with transgender themes
HarperCollins books
2014 LGBT-related literary works